Volleyball at the Friendship Games was contested in two events. Men's event took place at the Ciudad Deportiva in Havana, Cuba between 18 and 26 August 1984. Women's event took place in Varna, Bulgaria between 8 and 15 July 1984.

Men's event
Six teams competed in a round-robin tournament.

Results

Women's event
Ten teams were drawn into two groups.

Group A

Results

Group B

Results

Final round

Final

|}

Classification 5th–10th

Winning teams' squads

Medal table

See also
 Volleyball at the 1984 Summer Olympics

References

Friendship Games
1984 in volleyball
1984 in Cuban sport
1984 in Bulgarian sport
Friendship Games
Volleyball
Volleyball